Shafic (or Chafic) Abboud (1926 in Mhaidseh, near Bikfaya, Lebanon – 2004 in Paris, France) was a Lebanese painter. He studied at the Académie Libanaise des Beaux-Arts ALBA and left to Paris in 1947. Although he spent most of his life in France, he is considered as one of the most influential Lebanese artists of the 20th century.

Life and work
When Shafic Abboud arrived in Paris, he was immersed in the modernist and abstract tendencies of painting prevailing in the mid 20th century. He worked in the ateliers of Jean Metzinger, Othon Friesz, Fernand Léger and André Lhote before pursuing his studies at the École nationale supérieure des Beaux-Arts. These encounters, as well as his personal appreciation of Pierre Bonnard, Roger Bissière and Nicolas de Staël led him to move from a Lebanese tradition of figurative and landscape painting to a colorful personal abstraction.

Abboud remained attached to his oriental roots, remembering oral storytelling from his grandmother as well as Byzantine icons in churches that would eventually radiate in his works. Apart from painting, Abboud showed interest in other medias including ceramics, terracotta, carpets and lithography. He illustrated writing by poems such as Adonis and produce important artist's books.

Abboud's work has been widely recognized. He was part of Sajjil: A Century of Modern Art, the inauguration exhibition of Doha's Mathaf: Arab Museum of Modern Art. In 2011, the Paris-based Institut du Monde Arabe showed a retrospective of his work. Another comprehensive exhibition curated by Claude Lemand, Nadine Begdache and Saleh Barakat took place in May 2012 at the Beirut Exhibition Center.

Auctions
Shafic Abboud's works are highly demanded on the fine art market and have frequently seen their prices rise above US$100,000. His personal record is Chambre - La serviette bleue, 1977, a triptych proposed in 2007 with an estimation of US$120,000–150,000. It realized a price of $265,000. One year later, La Cathedrale was auctioned with a very high estimation of US$130,000–180,000 and was sold for $134,500. In October 2010, an Untitled painting was proposed for US$60,000–80,000 and was sold for $146,500. In October 2011, L'Amour en noir fleuri was hammered at US$122,500 and an untitled painting went for GBP67,250, thus doubling its estimation. In April 2013, a painting entitled "Le chemin d'Alep" realized US$387,750 after a $200,000–250,000 estimation.

Awards
 Prix du Musée Sursock, Beirut, 1964
 Prix Victor Choquet, Ministère des finances, France, 1961

Publications
Shafic Abboud. First Monograph, edited and published by Claude Lemand, Editions CLEA, Paris, 2006.
Shafic Abboud. Catalogue of the Retrospective, edited and published by Claude Lemand, Editions CLEA, Paris, 2011.
Shafic ABBOUD. Monograph, Pascale Le Thorel, Editions Skira, 2014. –

Selected exhibitions

Solo exhibitions
Shafic Abboud, Peintures et lithographies, 1957–2002, Galerie Claude Lemand, Paris, 2013.
Shafic Abboud Retrospective, Beirut Exhibition Center, Beirut, Lebanon, 2012
Shafic Abboud Retrospective, Institut du Monde Arabe, Paris, France, 2011
Peintures dans les collections européennes, 1954–2003, Espace Claude Lemand, Paris, 2010.
Pieces for a Museum (with Paul Guiragossian), Loft 46, Beirut Lebanon, 2010
Un parcours 1960–2002 : Huiles, Temperas, Lithographies. Galerie Claude Lemand, Paris, 2006,
Hommage à Chafic Abboud, Galerie Claude Lemand, Paris, 2004
Petits formats : cent six peintures, Galerie Claude Lemand, Paris, 2003
Peintures récentes, Galerie Claude Lemand, Paris, 2002
Galerie Jeanine Rubeiz, Beirut, Lebanon, 1999
Peintures récentes, Galerie Claude Lemand, Paris, France, 1998.
Les Robes de Simone, Galerie Claude Lemand, Paris, France, 1997.
Galerie Jeanine Rubeiz, Beirut, Lebanon, 1994
Gallery Contact, Beirut, Lebanon 1978
 Galerie Brigitte Schehadé, Paris, France, 1977
 M.L. de Boer, Amsterdam, Netherlands, 1975
 Centre d'Art, Beirut, Lebanon, 1972
Galerie Manoug, Beirut, Lebanon, 1970
Dar El Fan, Beirut, Lebanon, 1969
Centre d'Art, Beirut, Lebanon, 1965
Galerie Dorethea Loehr, Frankfurt, Germany, 1964
Galerie Raymonde Cazenave, Paris, France, 1961
Galerie Domus, Beirut, Lebanon, 1959
Galerie de Beaune, Paris, France, 1955
French Cultural Center, Beirut, Lebanon, 1950

Group exhibitions
 Art from Lebanon, Beirut Exhibition Center, 2012
 Sajjil: A Century of Modern Art, Mathaf: Arab Museum of Modern Art, Doha, 2010

References

External links
Website of Shafic Abboud
Shafic Abboud Retrospective at Institut du Monde Arabe
Shafic Abboud at Galerie Janine Rubeiz

1926 births
2004 deaths
Male painters
20th-century Lebanese painters